The Thompsons is an independent 2012 horror film directed by the Butcher Brothers (Mitchell Altieri and Phil Flores) and produced by Rob Weston and Travis Stevens. It is a sequel to the Butcher Brothers previous film The Hamiltons. It premiered at the London FrightFest Film Festival on August 26, 2012.

Filmed largely in the UK, several scenes feature The Ringlestone Inn Near Harrietsham, in Kent, south-east of London.

Premise
On the run from the law, the vampire family the Hamiltons (now known as the Thompsons) heads to England to find an ancient vampire clan known as the Stuarts. Unbeknownst to the Hamiltons, the Stuarts have motives of their own.

Cast
 Cory Knauf as Francis Thompson
 Elizabeth Henstridge as Riley Stuart
 Mackenzie Firgens as Darlene Thompson 
 Ryan Hartwig as Lenny Thompson
 Samuel Child as David Thompson 
 Sean Browne as Cole Stuart
 Tom Holloway as Ian Stuart
 Joseph McKelheer as Wendell Thompson
 Daniel O'Meara as Father Stuart
 Selina Giles as Mother Stuart
 Sean Cronin as Cyrus
 Andrei Alen as Sven (Swedish dude)
 Katarina Gellin as Ingrid (Swedish girl)

Reception
Beyond Hollywood wrote, "The Thompsons is very much a pleasant surprise, an entertaining and reasonably well crafted modern vampire tale. Though a little bit True Blood, the film is considerably more engaging than most others of its type, boosted by a likeable returning cast. The film’s real strengths are its surprisingly human script (written by the Butcher Brothers and Knauf) and solid character work, both of which help to keep the viewer involved".

References

External links

2012 films
2012 horror films
American vampire films
Incest in film
2010s English-language films
2010s American films